Hastings and Rye is a constituency in East Sussex represented in the House of Commons of the UK Parliament since 2019 by Sally-Ann Hart of the Conservative Party. From 2010 until 2019, it was represented by Amber Rudd, who served as Secretary of State for Energy and Climate Change, Minister for Women and Equalities, Secretary of State for the Home Department and Secretary of State for Work and Pensions under the governments of David Cameron, Theresa May and Boris Johnson.

Since 2001 (inclusive) election campaigns have resulted in a minimum of 35.1% of votes at each election consistently for the same two parties' choice for candidate, the next-placed party's having fluctuated between 3.3% and 15.7% of the vote—such third-placed figures attained higher percentages in 1992 and 1997.

The result in 2017 was the 24th-closest nationally (of 650 seats), whereby 174 voters would have been capable of changing the outcome by their choice of candidate, the margin of votes being 346.

Boundaries 
1983–2010: The Borough of Hastings, the District of Rother wards of Camber, Fairlight, Guestling and Pett, Rye, Winchelsea
2010–present: The Borough of Hastings, the District of Rother wards of Brede Valley, Eastern Rother, Marsham, Rye

Constituency profile 

As its name suggests, the main settlements in the constituency are the seaside resort of Hastings and smaller nearby tourist town of Rye. The constituency also includes the Cinque Port of Winchelsea and the villages of Fairlight, Winchelsea Beach, Three Oaks, Guestling, Icklesham, Playden, Iden, Rye Harbour, East Guldeford, Camber, and Pett.

The constituency is set in a relatively isolated part of the southeast from the railways perspective and so does not enjoy some of the more general affluence of this part of the country. In the 2000 index of multiple deprivation a majority of wards fell within the bottom half of rankings so it can arguably be considered a deprived area. Hastings has some light industry, while Rye has a small port, which includes hire and repair activities for leisure vessels and fishing. Hastings is mostly Labour-voting, whereas Rye and the rest of the areas from Rother council are Conservative.

Property prices in the villages are however rising and are in affluent areas, unlike residential estates in the towns. Three Oaks does enjoy a nearby train station for its residents, which has services allowing connecting services to London.

History 
The constituency was created in 1983 by combining most of Hastings with a small part of Rye. The Conservative MP for Hastings since 1970, Kenneth Warren, won the new seat.. Warren held Hastings and Rye until he chose to retire in 1992; during this period its large majorities suggested it was a Conservative safe seat, with the Liberal Party (now the Liberal Democrats) regularly coming second. Jacqui Lait won the seat on Warren's retirement, but in 1997 the Labour candidate Michael Foster narrowly defeated Lait, becoming the second-least expected (on swing) Labour MP in the landslide of that year and since 2001 setting a pattern that suggests the seat is a two-way Labour-Conservative marginal. Foster held the seat, again with slim majorities over Conservatives, in 2001 and 2005, but lost it to Conservative Amber Rudd in 2010. Rudd was re-elected with an increased majority in 2015.

In the 2017 general election, the Green Party declined to contest the seat and instead called on its supporters to back the Labour candidate. Rudd held the seat with a slim majority of 346.

Members of Parliament

Elections

Elections in the 2010s

Elections in the 2000s

Elections in the 1990s

Elections in the 1980s

See also
 List of parliamentary constituencies in East Sussex

Notes

References

Sources
 Election 2005 Result: Hastings & Rye BBC News, 23 May 2005
 Vote 2001 - Hastings & Rye BBC News, 8 June 2001
 Election results, 1997 – 2001  Election Demon
 Election results, 1983 – 1992  Election Demon

Parliamentary constituencies in South East England
Politics of East Sussex
Politics of Hastings
Rother District
Constituencies of the Parliament of the United Kingdom established in 1983